Eleazar Soria Ibarra (11 January 1948 – 24 June 2021) was a Peruvian professional footballer who played as a right-back.

He won the 1975 Copa America with the Peru national team.

Club career
Eleazar Soria was born in Lima. At club level he played for Universitario de Deportes, Independiente (Argentina) and Sporting Cristal. He won the Libertadores Cup with Independiente in 1975, as well as four Peruvian Leagues with Universitario (1967, 1969, 1971 and 1974) and two more with Sporing Cristal (1979, 1980).

International career
Eleazar Soria earned 29 caps for the Peru national team between 1972 and 1978.

Death
Eleazar Soria died on 24 June 2021 aged 73.

Honors
Universitario
 Peruvian Premier Division: 1967, 1969, 1971, 1974

Sporting Cristal
 Peruvian Premier Division: 1979, 1980

Independiente
 Copa Libertadores: 1975
 Copa Interamericana: 1976

Peru
 Copa América: 1975

See also
1978 FIFA World Cup squads

References

External links 
  Entrevista
  Ciudad del Rey
  JNE Hoja de vida

1948 births
2021 deaths
People from Lima
Peruvian footballers
Association football fullbacks
Peru international footballers
Copa América-winning players
1975 Copa América players
Club Universitario de Deportes footballers
Club Atlético Independiente footballers
Sporting Cristal footballers
Argentine Primera División players
Peruvian expatriate footballers
Peruvian expatriate sportspeople in Argentina
Expatriate footballers in Argentina